Nowy Sącz-Łososina Dolna Airport - airport in Łososina Dolna near Nowy Sącz.

Plane crash in Witowice 

A plane crash occurred in Witowice Dolne on August 21, 2011. The plane was flying from airport Nowy Sącz-Łososina Dolna to airport Kraków-Pobiednik Wielki. Witowice Dolne is located about 1 km from the airport. The cause is not known. Two people died.

Bibliography 

 
 Katastrofa samolotu ultralekkiego pod Nowym Sączem. Polish Wikinews

References

Airports in Poland
Buildings and structures in Nowy Sącz